Political entities in the 2nd century BC – Political entities in the 1st century – Political entities by year
This is a list of political entities that existed between 100 BC and 1 BC.

Political entities

See also
List of Bronze Age states
List of Iron Age states
List of Classical Age states
List of states during Late Antiquity
List of states during the Middle Ages

References
 

-01
1st century BC-related lists